Per Bahngura is a union parishad under Bhangura Upazila of Pabna District in the Rajshahi Division of western Bangladesh.

Geography
It is located in the southern part of the Bhangura upazila. It is situated at the bank of the river Baral.

Administration
Per Bhangura union comprises eight villages. They are Per Bhangura, Pathorghata, Bheramara, Hutgram, Kalika Daha, Patulipara, Kashipur and Rangalia. The union council building is at Bheramara.

Union Parishad Chairman: Alhaz Hedhayeatul Haque

Infrastructure
There is a post office, health centre, secondary school, four primary schools and two bazaars – Bheramara and Jogatola in this union.

Transport
Per Bhangura is well communicated with other parts of the upazila and district. It is also well communicated with rest of the country by road, rail and river.

Notable residents
 Diplomat M Hossain Ali was born in this union. A road is named after him near his birthplace.

References

Unions of Bhangura Upazila